Now Voyager may refer to:

Now, Voyager (album), the 2011 mini-album by The Cape Race
Now, Voyager, the 1942 film starring Bette Davis
Now Voyager, the 1984 solo album by Barry Gibb
The Source (musician), who used Now Voyager as an alias